Burn This Book: PEN Writers Speak Out on the Power of the Word is a 2009 book about censorship in literature, edited by Toni Morrison. It includes essays by Russell Banks, Nadine Gordimer, David Grossman, Pico Iyer, Orhan Pamuk, Ed Park, Salman Rushdie, and John Updike.

References

2009 non-fiction books
2009 anthologies
Essay anthologies
Books about literature
Books about censorship
Censorship in the arts
Literature controversies
Works by Toni Morrison